Judith "Jay" Dahlgren (born December 7, 1948 in Vancouver, British Columbia) is a retired javelin thrower from Canada, who represented her native country at the 1968 Summer Olympics. She claimed the bronze medal in the women's javelin throw event at the 1967 Pan American Games in Winnipeg, Manitoba, Canada.

She also competed at the Commonwealth Games, winning the bronze medal at the 1966 and 1970 Games.

References

External links
 Canadian Olympic Committee

1948 births
Living people
Canadian female javelin throwers
Athletes (track and field) at the 1966 British Empire and Commonwealth Games
Athletes (track and field) at the 1967 Pan American Games
Athletes (track and field) at the 1968 Summer Olympics
Athletes (track and field) at the 1970 British Commonwealth Games
Athletes (track and field) at the 1975 Pan American Games
Olympic track and field athletes of Canada
Athletes from Vancouver
Commonwealth Games medallists in athletics
Pan American Games bronze medalists for Canada
Commonwealth Games bronze medallists for Canada
Pan American Games medalists in athletics (track and field)
Medalists at the 1967 Pan American Games
20th-century Canadian women
Medallists at the 1966 British Empire and Commonwealth Games
Medallists at the 1970 British Commonwealth Games